Pseudagrilus is a genus of beetles in the family Buprestidae, containing the following species:

 Pseudagrilus alutaceus Obenberger, 1924
 Pseudagrilus arabicus Obenberger, 1925
 Pseudagrilus beryllinus (Fahraeus, 1851)
 Pseudagrilus curtus Thery, 1930
 Pseudagrilus cyanimus (Fahraeus, 1851)
 Pseudagrilus dubius Obenberger, 1924
 Pseudagrilus gedyei Thery, 1930
 Pseudagrilus hunti Thery, 1941
 Pseudagrilus inamaenus Thery, 1930
 Pseudagrilus inornatus Harold, 1878
 Pseudagrilus keniae Obenberger, 1924
 Pseudagrilus lathami Thery, 1930
 Pseudagrilus leonensis Kerremans, 1898
 Pseudagrilus melliculus (Gory, 1841)
 Pseudagrilus paradiseus Obenberger, 1924
 Pseudagrilus parallelus Kerremans, 1913
 Pseudagrilus pauliani Descarpentries, 1946
 Pseudagrilus peringueyi Bellamy, 1990
 Pseudagrilus scintillans (Fairmaire, 1903)
 Pseudagrilus seydeli Thery, 1940
 Pseudagrilus sjoestedti Kerremans, 1908
 Pseudagrilus sophorae (Fabricius, 1793)
 Pseudagrilus splendidus Laporte, 1835
 Pseudagrilus subfasciatus Kerremans, 1898
 Pseudagrilus variabilis Thery, 1930
 Pseudagrilus wittei Thery, 1948
 Pseudagrilus zonatus Roth, 1851

References

Buprestidae genera